S/2004 S 21 is a natural satellite of Saturn. Its discovery was announced by Scott S. Sheppard, David C. Jewitt, and Jan Kleyna on October 7, 2019 from observations taken between December 12, 2004 and January 17, 2007.

S/2004 S 21 is about 3 kilometres in diameter, and orbits Saturn at an average distance of 22.645 Gm in 1272.61 days, at an inclination of 160° to the ecliptic, in a retrograde direction and with an eccentricity of 0.318.

References

Norse group
Irregular satellites
Moons of Saturn
Discoveries by Scott S. Sheppard
Astronomical objects discovered in 2019
Moons with a retrograde orbit